The Conquering Power (1921) is an American silent romantic drama directed by Rex Ingram and starring Rudolph Valentino, Alice Terry, and Ralph Lewis. The film was based on the 1833 novel Eugénie Grandet by Honoré de Balzac. Its sets were designed by Ralph Barton.

Plot
After the death of his father, young dandy Charles Grandet (Rudolph Valentino) is taken under the care of his uncle, Monsieur Grandet (Ralph Lewis). The miserly Grandet, despite being the wealthiest man in his province, forces his family to live in poverty and schemes to cheat his nephew out of his inheritance from his father.

Charles falls in love with Grandet's daughter Eugenie (Alice Terry) but Grandet condemns their love, and sends Charles away. While Charles is away, Grandet kills Eugenie's mother, which sends him further into a maddened state. Later, it is revealed that Eugenie is not really Monsieur Grandet's daughter; if she knew, then she could reclaim all of the gold that originally belonged to her mother, leaving her father penniless. Monsieur Grandet has a violent argument with Eugenie, after she finds letters sent by Charles that her father had hidden, and Monsieur Grandet accidentally locks himself in a small room where he keeps his gold. He starts hallucinating and is eventually killed after becoming frantic.

Eugenie is now left an extremely wealthy young lady, which only intensifies the pressure put on her by two competing families to marry one of the suitors. She announces her engagement, but shortly after is reunited with Charles.

Cast
Alice Terry as Eugenie Grandet
Rudolph Valentino as Charles Grandet
Ralph Lewis as Père Grandet
Carrie Daumery as Madame Grandet
Bridgetta Clark as Madame des Grassins
Mark Fenton as Monsieur des Grassins
Ward Wing as Adolphe des Grassins
Eric Mayne as Victor Grandet
Edward Connelly as Notary Cruchot
George Atkinson as Bonfons Cruchot
Willard Lee Hall as Abbé Cruchot

Reception
A review from Photoplay claims that "The thoughtfully worked out characterizations and the general atmosphere are not only faithful to Balzac but go to make absorbing and valuable entertainment."

References

External links
 
 The Conquering Power at SilentEra
 

1921 films
1921 romantic drama films
American romantic drama films
American silent feature films
American black-and-white films
Films based on Eugénie Grandet
Films directed by Rex Ingram
Articles containing video clips
Surviving American silent films
Metro Pictures films
1920s American films
Silent romantic drama films
Silent American drama films